Reigolil River is the main tributary to Trancura River in La Araucanía Region, Chile. Reigolil River flows from north to south following the Reigolil-Pirihueico Fault. The river has a catchment area that includes the southern slopes of Sollipulli Volcano in the north and a large portion of land east of Huerquehue National Park.

See also
List of rivers of Chile

Rivers of Chile
Rivers of Araucanía Region